"Nice Weather for Ducks" is a song recorded by British electronic band Lemon Jelly, released on 20 January 2003 from their second studio album Lost Horizons (2002).

The song spent three weeks on the UK chart, peaking at number 16. The track is primarily built around a sample of John Langstaff's All the Ducks, which is an English translation of the traditional Dutch children's song Alle Eendjes Zwemmen in het Water.

Track listing 

Track 2 is from the Soft/Rock single, and contains elements of "If You Leave Me Now" by Chicago.

References

External links
 Lyrics

2003 singles
Lemon Jelly songs
XL Recordings singles
2002 songs